Tito Ceccherini (born 1973) is an Italian conductor with a focus on opera, especially contemporary opera. He has performed at major opera houses in Europe, leading several world premieres.

Career 
Ceccherini was born in Milan and studied in his hometown.

He conducted world premieres, including Sciarrino's Da gelo a gelo at the Schwetzingen Festival in 2006, Philippe Fénelon's La Cerisaie at the Bolshoi Theatre in Moscow in 2010,  and Sciarrino's Superflumina at the Nationaltheater Mannheim in 2011.

At the Oper Frankfurt, he conducted Janáček's Aus einem Totenhaus, Stravinsky's The Rake’s Progress, Bellini's I puritani and the world premiere of Lucia Ronchetti's Inferno in 2021.

References

External links 
 
 
 Tito Ceccherini (management, in German) msbuhl.com
 Tito Ceccherini Forum Opéra
 Tito Ceccherini Opera Online

Italian conductors (music)
Male conductors (music)
1973 births
Living people